Aegaleus can refer to:

 Aegaleus (bug), a genus of stink bugs or shield bugs
Egaleo or Aigaleo, a municipality in Attica, Greece
Egaleo (mountain), a mountain